Hartig net is a network of inward-growing hyphae, that extends into the root, penetrating between the epidermis and cortex of ectomycorrhizal plants. This network is a site of nutrient exchange between the fungus and the host plant. The Hartig net is one of the three components required for ectomycorrhizal roots to form as part of ectomycorrhizal symbiosis with the host tree or plant.

The Hartig net is named after Theodor Hartig, a 19th-century German forest biologist and botanist.  He reported research in 1842 on the anatomy of the interface between ectomycorrhizal fungi and tree roots.

The Hartig net supplies chemical elements required for plant growth, such as potassium, and provides compounds, such as nitrate,  used in combination with the ectomycorrhizal symbiosis for farmable crops, as well as certain kinds of lichens.  Part of its role in mutualistic interactions is based on the chemicals it provides, as well as it being essential for bi-directional nutritional uptake, which has shown to help defend the fungi from heavy metal damage,  amongst other benefits.

See also

 Mycorrhiza

References

Plant roots
Soil biology
Symbiosis
Fungal morphology and anatomy